Adam Nash  (born August 29, 2000) is an American who was conceived using preimplantation genetic diagnosis (PGD).

Early life
Adam's parents conceived him through in-vitro fertilization and preimplantation genetic diagnosis (PGD) so he could donate cord blood to Molly his sister, who was born with Fanconi Anaemia, and be free of the disease himself. Adam was born on August 29, 2000 by Caesarean section. In October 2000, the blood from Adam's umbilical cord was transplanted to Adam's sister.

Adam's conception and birth received both praise and criticism due to the ethical issues surrounding PGD and was also the inspiration of the novel My Sister's Keeper by Jodi Picoult. Adam has been called "the world's first savior sibling" and "the first designer baby".

References

Living people
2000 births